The 1998 FIS Ski Jumping Grand Prix was the 5th Summer Grand Prix season in ski jumping on plastic. Season began on the 9 August 1998 in Stams, Austria and ended on 13 September 1998 in Hakuba, Japan.

Other competitive circuits this season included the World Cup and Continental Cup.

Calendar

Men

Standings

Overall

Nations Cup

References

Grand Prix
FIS Grand Prix Ski Jumping